Bignay may refer to:

 Antidesma bunius, a fruit tree
Bignay wine, a Filipino alcoholic drink made from A. bunius berries.
 Bignay, Charente-Maritime, a commune in western France
 Bignay, Valenzuela City, a barangay in the Philippines